Colorado Scenic and Historic Byways are highway and backroad routes in the U.S. state of Colorado designated by the Colorado Scenic and Historic Byways Commission for their scenic and historic values. These byways follow existing roads or highways and are signed with a Colorado blue columbine (the Colorado state flower) logo denoting the route. The Colorado Scenic and Historic Byways Program was established in March 1989, and is one of the oldest state scenic byway programs.

In addition to state scenic byway designations, four federal agencies designate specific types of scenic byways:
The National Park Service administers congressionally authorized 
The United States Forest Service designates and manages  in National Forests and National Grasslands.
The Bureau of Land Management designates and manages  in areas managed by the BLM.

The Colorado Scenic and Historic Byways Commission works closely with these four federal agencies to select scenic and historic byways that meet federal criteria. Of the 26 current Colorado designated byways, 21 already have a federal designation as well. These include two All-American Roads, 11 National Scenic Byways, ten National Forest Scenic Byways, and three Back Country Byways.

The 13 combined All-American Roads and National Scenic Byways in Colorado are currently the most of any state. Five Colorado byways currently have two federal designations. The San Juan Skyway Scenic and Historic Byway is both an All-American Road and a National Forest Scenic Byway. The Grand Mesa National Scenic Byway, the Highway of Legends National Scenic Byway, and the Silver Thread Scenic and Historic Byway are both National Scenic Byways and National Forest Scenic Byways. The Gold Belt Tour Scenic and Historic Byway is both a National Scenic Byway and a Back Country Byway.


Colorado Scenic and Historic Byways Commission
The Colorado Scenic and Historic Byways Commission was established in 1989 to administer the Colorado Scenic and Historic Byways Program. The Governor of Colorado appoints the members of the commission. 
The program is a statewide partnership intended to provide recreational, educational, and economic benefits to residents and visitors by designating, interpreting, protecting, and promoting a system of outstanding touring routes in Colorado. 
Proposed routes are nominated by local communities and approved by the Commission, but byway development is managed at the local level.

The Commission works with:
State agencies including the Colorado Department of Transportation, the Colorado Department of Natural Resources, the Colorado Department of Local Affairs, and the Colorado Tourism Office;
Federal agencies including the National Park Service, the United States Forest Service, the Bureau of Land Management, and the Federal Highway Administration;
County and municipal governments;
Local byways organizations, community organizations, interested individuals, and public and private resources;
Scenic byway programs in the seven adjacent states of Wyoming, Nebraska, Kansas, Oklahoma, New Mexico, Arizona, and Utah.

The Commission uses the following criteria to select potential byways:
The proposed Scenic and Historic Byway must possess unusual, exceptional, and distinctive scenic, recreational, historical, educational, scientific, geological, natural, wildlife, cultural, or ethnic features.
The proposed Scenic and Historic Byway must be suitable for the prescribed types of vehicular use.
The proposed Scenic and Historic Byway must be an existing route and have legal public access.
The proposed Scenic and Historic Byway must have strong local support and proponents must demonstrate coordination with relevant agencies.
The proposed Scenic and Historic Byway must be accompanied by a conceptual plan, as specified in the nomination process.
The Commission favors proposed byways with both scenic and historic features. Byways with predominantly scenic features are labeled a "Scenic Byway" or a "National Scenic Byway" if also an All-American Road or a National Scenic Byway. Byways with predominantly historic features are labeled a "Historic Byway". Byways with both strong scenic and historic features are labeled a "Scenic and Historic Byway".

Scenic Byways

Gallery

See also

Scenic byways in the United States

Notes

References

External links

America's Byways
America's Scenic Byways: Colorado
Bureau of Land Management Back Country Byways
Colorado Department of Transportation
Colorado Scenic & Historic Byways Commission
Colorado Scenic & Historic Byways
Colorado Travel Map
Colorado Tourism Office
History Colorado
National Forest Scenic Byways

 
Lists of roads in Colorado